Matthew Goldstein (born November 10, 1941) is the former chancellor of the City University of New York (CUNY). 
Goldstein was appointed CUNY chancellor on September 1, 1999. He was the first City University graduate to head the University, having received his undergraduate degree from City College. Previously, Goldstein served as president of Baruch College from 1991 to 1998, and president of Adelphi University, from 1998 to 1999.

Goldstein is credited for raising CUNY admissions standards, creating thousands of additional full-time faculty positions, and otherwise reforming a system deemed by a 1999 mayoral task force report to be "an institution adrift." Goldstein led a successful effort to revitalize the CUNY system. During his tenure, he established CUNY School of Public Health at Hunter College, CUNY School of Pharmacy at York College, the William E. Macaulay Honors College, CUNY Graduate School of Journalism, and CUNY School of Professional Studies.  He proclaimed "Decade of Science" to create the CUNY Advanced Science Research Center on the City College of New York campus in Manhattan, as well as additional new science facilities on CUNY campus in each the five boroughs of the City of New York. Moreover, distinguished faculty in the STEM fields were recruited and retained from around the world. Under Goldstein's leadership, the State's Teacher Certification exams rose above a 98% pass-rate, and CUNY's first capital fundraising campaign successfully raised over $1.4 billion.

On April 12, 2013, Goldstein announced his plans to retire, stepping down on July 1, 2013. He attracted controversy after stepping down for continuing to receive a $490,000 salary whilst on study leave for a year, and then acting as Chancellor Emeritus for $300,000 a year.

Professional recognition
Goldstein's honors include the Carnegie Corporation of New York's Academic Leadership Award (2007). He is a fellow of the New York Academy of Sciences, and American Academy of Arts and Sciences (2006).

Education
Goldstein earned a bachelor's degree in statistics and mathematics from the City College of New York, and a doctorate in mathematical statistics from the University of Connecticut. He has been a professor of mathematics and statistics at Baruch College, Cooper Union, and at the University of Connecticut. He has published numerous books and articles. Goldstein is a member of Beta Gamma Sigma and the Golden Key International Honour Society.

References

External links
The City University of New York
Official Biography

Living people
University of Connecticut alumni
Cooper Union faculty
University of Connecticut faculty
Adelphi University people
Chancellors of City University of New York
City College of New York alumni
Baruch College faculty
Presidents of Baruch College
20th-century American Jews
Educators from New York City
1941 births
21st-century American Jews